The Polytelini tribe belongs to the parrot family Psittaculidae and consists of three genera.

Species
 Genus Alisterus
 Australian king parrot, Alisterus scapularis
 Moluccan king parrot, Alisterus amboinensis
 Papuan king parrot, Alisterus chloropterus
 Genus Aprosmictus
 Jonquil parrot, Aprosmictus jonquillaceus
 Red-winged parrot, Aprosmictus erythropterus
 Genus Polytelis
 Superb parrot, Polytelis swainsonii
 Regent parrot, Polytelis anthopeplus
 Princess parrot, Polytelis alexandrae

References 

 
Psittaculinae
Bird tribes